The following lists events that happened during 2015 in Armenia.

Incumbents
 President: Serzh Sargsyan
 Prime Minister: Hovik Abrahamyan
 Speaker: Galust Sahakyan

Events

January
 January 1 – Armenia joins the Eurasian Economic Union.
 January 12 – A serviceman stationed at the Russian 102nd Military Base, Valery Permyakov, kills six members of an Armenian family, including a two-year-old child, and, in addition, wounds a six-month-old child, in Gyumri, initiating a manhunt by the Armenian security services.
 January 19 – A six-month-old boy dies in hospital of his wounds, becoming the seventh member of an Armenian family dead after a killing spree by a Russian soldier.

April
 April 24 – The 100th anniversary of the Armenian genocide is commemorated.

References

 
2010s in Armenia
Years of the 21st century in Armenia
Armenia
Armenia
Armenia